is a series of six bishōjo-centered manga booklets that were released weekly for a short time in Japan. The manga would come packaged with a limited edition plastic-figure assembly kit, designed by Ohshima Yuki, of the featured character of the week. These figures of small-breasted prepubescent girls helped to expand the niche market of lolicon and also placed Ohshima in high esteem among figure collectors in Japan due to the high level of detail and clever portrayals. Some of Ohshima's figurines are reproduced by Takashi Murakami (Murakami, 2005).

References

 Murakami, Takashi (editor). Little Boy: The Arts of Japan's Exploding Subculture. New York: Japan Society, 2005. pp. 54–55

External links
 Review of volume 1 with pictures (Archived)
 Use of Weekly Dearest My Brother figures in digital art 
 Otaku Talk 

2003 manga
MediaWorks (publisher)
Seinen manga